JSC National Air Carrier "Kyrgyzstan Airlines" was the national airline of Kyrgyzstan, with its head office on the grounds of Manas International Airport in Bishkek. It operated scheduled international and domestic services, as well as charter flights. Its main base was Manas International Airport, with a hub at Osh Airport.

History 

The airline was formerly a division of Aeroflot after a cooperation agreement in 1997. 

On 2 January 2002 the airline moved its head office to the Kyrgyzstan Airlines Sales Agency building of Manas International Airport. Previously the head office was also on the grounds of the airport.

In 2005 the airline went bankrupt and was taken over by Altyn Air, which was rebranded as Kyrgyzstan Air Company in 2006.

The airline was owned by the government (81%), private shareholders (11%) and the Soial Foundation (8%).

Destinations 
Kyrgyzstan Airlines operated scheduled passenger flights to the following destinations:

China - Urumqi
Germany - Frankfurt, Hannover
India - Delhi
Kyrgyzstan - Bishkek, Jalal-Abad, Kazarman, Kerben, Osh
Pakistan - Karachi
Russia - Moscow, Nizhniy Novgorod, Novosibirsk, Saint Petersburg, Samara, Yekaterinburg
Tajikistan - Dushanbe
Turkey - Istanbul
United Kingdom - Birmingham

Fleet 
In 2005 the Kyrgyzstan Airlines fleet included the following aircraft:
1 Airbus A320
1 Antonov An-26
5 Antonov An-28
2 Ilyushin Il-76TD 
2 Tupolev Tu-134A
2 Tupolev Tu-154M
2 Yakovlev Yak-40

References

External links 

Kyrgyzstan Airlines (Archive)
Kyrgyzstan Airlines Fleet

Defunct airlines of Kyrgyzstan
Airlines established in 1992
Airlines disestablished in 2005
Former Aeroflot divisions
1992 establishments in Kyrgyzstan
2005 disestablishments in Asia